Gradiško is small settlement in the Municipality of Bloke in the Inner Carniola region of Slovenia. It no longer has any permanent residents.

References

External links
Gradiško on Geopedia

Populated places in the Municipality of Bloke